In Greek mythology, Cepheus (Ancient Greek: Κηφεύς Kepheús) was the name of two rulers of Aethiopia, grandfather and grandson.

Family
Cepheus was the son of either Belus, Agenor or Phoenix. If Belus was his father, he had Achiroe, daughter of Nilus as mother, and Danaus, Aegyptus and Phineus as brothers. He was called Iasid Cepheus, pertaining to his Argive ancestry through King Iasus of Argus, father of Io.

Mythology 

Cepheus is prominently featured in the Perseus legend as the husband of Cassiopeia and father of Princess Andromeda, and whose brother Phineus expected to marry Andromeda. Various sources described his kingdom to be "Aethiopia" or later as the city of Joppa (Jaffa) in Phoenicia, which was named after the elder Cepheus' wife, Iope, daughter of Aeolus.

Cepheus's proud wife Cassiopeia boasted that Andromeda was more beautiful than the Nereids, angering both the sea-nymphs and Poseidon. In response, Poseidon sent a flood and the sea monster Cetus to attack Aethiopia. Cepheus and Cassiopeia sought guidance from the oracle of Ammon (identified with Zeus) at the oasis of Siwa in the Libyan desert; she declared the calamity would not end until their daughter Andromeda was offered to the monster as a human sacrifice. The king chained his daughter to a rock by the shore to be devoured by Cetus at the whim of his subjects.

Andromeda was saved when Perseus, flying home with his trophy head of Medusa, passed by the kingdom of Cepheus and noticed a beautiful girl chained to a rock on the shore. Perseus fell in love with her and undertook to slay the monster if she promised to marry him; in a slightly different version, he approached her father Cepheus. The hero then killed the monster (or turned it to stone by showing it the Gorgon’s head). Perseus washed off his blood in a spring near the city of Joppa which apocryphally turned red as a result.

Cepheus and Cassiopeia allowed Perseus to become Andromeda's husband after he used Medusa's head to turn Phineus and his men to stone for plotting against him. According to Hyginus, the betrothed of Andromeda was named Agenor. After spending a year or so at the court of his father-in-law, Perseus finally set off for Seriphos with his wife. Since Cepheus had no heir of his own, the departing couple allowed him to adopt their first-born child, Perses, who was destined to give his name to the Persians. Cepheus was later made into the constellation Cepheus.

See also
 List of legendary monarchs of Ethiopia

Notes

References

Primary sources 
Apollodorus, The Library with an English Translation by Sir James George Frazer, F.B.A., F.R.S. in 2 Volumes, Cambridge, MA, Harvard University Press; London, William Heinemann Ltd. 1921. ISBN 0-674-99135-4. Online version at the Perseus Digital Library. Greek text available from the same website.
Aratus Solensis, Phaenomena translated by G. R. Mair. Loeb Classical Library Volume 129. London: William Heinemann, 1921. Online version at the Topos Text Project.
Aratus Solensis, Phaenomena. G. R. Mair. London: William Heinemann; New York: G.P. Putnam's Sons. 1921. Greek text available at the Perseus Digital Library.
Gaius Julius Hyginus, Astronomica from The Myths of Hyginus translated and edited by Mary Grant. University of Kansas Publications in Humanistic Studies. Online version at the Topos Text Project.
Hyginus. Fabulae and Astronomica. Translated and edited by Mary Grant. University of Kansas Publications in Humanistic Studies, no. 34. Lawrence: University of Kansas Press, 1960.
Gaius Julius Hyginus, Fabulae from The Myths of Hyginus translated and edited by Mary Grant. University of Kansas Publications in Humanistic Studies. Online version at the Topos Text Project.
Herodotus, The Histories with an English translation by A. D. Godley. Cambridge. Harvard University Press. 1920. . Online version at the Topos Text Project. Greek text available at Perseus Digital Library.
Nonnus of Panopolis, Dionysiaca translated by William Henry Denham Rouse (1863-1950), from the Loeb Classical Library, Cambridge, MA, Harvard University Press, 1940.  Online version at the Topos Text Project.
 Nonnus of Panopolis, Dionysiaca. 3 Vols. W.H.D. Rouse. Cambridge, MA., Harvard University Press; London, William Heinemann, Ltd. 1940-1942. Greek text available at the Perseus Digital Library.
 Pausanias, Description of Greece with an English Translation by W.H.S. Jones, Litt.D., and H.A. Ormerod, M.A., in 4 Volumes. Cambridge, MA, Harvard University Press; London, William Heinemann Ltd. 1918. . Online version at the Perseus Digital Library
Pausanias, Graeciae Descriptio. 3 vols. Leipzig, Teubner. 1903.  Greek text available at the Perseus Digital Library.
Publius Ovidius Naso, Metamorphoses translated by Brookes More (1859-1942). Boston, Cornhill Publishing Co. 1922. Online version at the Perseus Digital Library.
Publius Ovidius Naso, Metamorphoses. Hugo Magnus. Gotha (Germany). Friedr. Andr. Perthes. 1892. Latin text available at the Perseus Digital Library.
Stephanus of Byzantium, Stephani Byzantii Ethnicorum quae supersunt, edited by August Meineike (1790-1870), published 1849. A few entries from this important ancient handbook of place names have been translated by Brady Kiesling. Online version at the Topos Text Project.

Secondary sources 
 Hard, Robin, The Routledge Handbook of Greek Mythology: Based on H.J. Rose's "Handbook of Greek Mythology", Psychology Press, 2004, . Google Books.
The Heroes Or, Greek Fairy Tales for my Children by Charles Kingsley (1901). Page 38

Kings in Greek mythology
Ethiopian characters in Greek mythology
Phoenician characters in Greek mythology
Phoenician mythology